Neil Edmonds (born 18 October 1968) is a former English  footballer who played as a forward.

References

1968 births
Living people
English footballers
Association football defenders
Rochdale A.F.C. players
Oldham Athletic A.F.C. players
English Football League players